Erica cremea is a plant belonging to the genus Erica. The plant is endemic to the Western Cape and is prevalent on Sneeukop near Wellington. Its habitat is threatened by invasive plants.

References

cremea
IUCN Red List vulnerable species